Odonthalitus improprius is a species of moth of the family Tortricidae. It is found in Oaxaca, Mexico.

The length of the forewings is 5.8 mm. The forewings are pale tan and the hindwings are pale cream with pale grey-brown mottling.

Etymology
The species name is derived from the Latin word for inappropriate or improper.

References

Moths described in 2000
Euliini